Expect the Best is the fourth studio album by American band Widowspeak. It was released in August 2017 under Captured Tracks.

Track listing

References

2017 albums
Captured Tracks albums